Lelești is a commune in Gorj County, Oltenia, Romania. It is composed of three villages: Frătești, Lelești and Rasovița.

Natives
 Petre Popeangă

References

Communes in Gorj County
Localities in Oltenia